Iris latifolia, the English iris, also known as I. xiphiodes and I. anglica, is a hardy flowering bulbous species of the iris genus, in the family Iridaceae. It is native to the Pyrenees of Southwestern France and Northwestern Spain. It is widely cultivated in temperate regions for its blue flowers which appear in early Summer.

Iris latifolia grows to a height of 50 cm. 
The plant produces two or three deep blue flowers with yellow marks in the center of the lower petals. Flowers have six tepals and are 12–13 cm in diameter. Leaves are stiff and sword-shaped, approximately 60 cm long, and dark green to teal in color. Leaves begin growth in early spring, before the snow has entirely melted. It is a bulbous iris, as opposed to a rhizomatous iris. The bulb has a thin, dark brown skin and grows 10–15 cm deep in the ground.

References

latifolia
Taxa named by Philip Miller